Porphyromonadaceae is a family of bacteria.

References

Bacteroidia